The Indian Navy currently operates twenty-four air squadrons. Of these, eleven operate fixed-wing aircraft, nine are helicopter squadrons and the remaining three are equipped with unmanned aerial vehicles (UAV). Building on the legacy inherited from the Royal Navy prior to Indian independence, the concept of naval aviation in India started with the establishment of Directorate of Naval Aviation at Naval Headquarters (NHQ) in early 1948. Later that year officers and sailors from the Indian Navy were sent to Britain for pilot training. In 1951, the Fleet Requirement Unit (FRU) was formed to meet the aviation requirements of the navy. On 1 January 1953, the charge of Cochin airfield was handed over to the navy from the Directorate General of Civil Aviation. On 11 March, the FRU was commissioned at Cochin with ten newly acquired Sealand aircraft. The navy's first air station, INS Garuda, was commissioned two months later. From February 1955 to December 1958, ten Firefly aircraft were acquired. To meet the training requirements of the pilots, the indigenously developed HAL HT-2 trainer was inducted into the FRU. On 17 January 1959, the FRU was commissioned as Indian Naval Air Squadron (INAS) 550, to be the first Indian naval air squadron. In the following two years, three more naval air squadrons—INAS 300, INAS 310 and INAS 551—were commissioned. The first two operated from the newly purchased aircraft carrier  flying Sea Hawks and Alizés, whereas the latter one, equipped with Vampires, was used for training purposes.

Between 1961 and 1971, three helicopter squadrons were commissioned—INAS 321, INAS 330 and INAS 561. The first two were equipped with HAL Chetak and Sea King 42Bs for search and rescue and anti-submarine roles respectively, whereas the later one assumed a training role. In December 1971, the squadrons embarked on the aircraft carrier INS Vikrant saw action in the 1971 Indo-Pakistani War. Between 1976 and 1977, INAS 312 and INAS 315 were commissioned with Super Constellation and Ilyushin Il-38s respectively. In December 1980, another helicopter squadron intended for anti-submarine warfare—INAS 333—was commissioned. It was initially equipped with Ka-25s, and with Ka-28s in late 1980s. In 1984, one patrol and one helicopter squadron—INAS 318 and INAS 336—were commissioned. The patrol squadron was initially equipped with Islander aircraft, but they were replaced by Dornier 228s in 2000. In November 1990, another Sea King squadron—INAS 339—was commissioned. Later in 1993, the Sea Kings were replaced by Ka-28s, and in 2003, Ka-31s were inducted, making it the only Indian naval air squadron for the role of airborne early warning and control.

Though several new fixed wing aircraft and helicopters were inducted into the navy in the early 2000s, they were assigned to the existing squadrons with no new squadrons being commissioned until 2006. In January of that year, INAS 342, the first squadron to be equipped with UAVs, was commissioned. Later that year, the Sea Harrier training assigned to INAS 551 were detached and commissioned separately as INAS 552. However, the Sea Harriers were phased out in May 2016, and presently the operational status of the squadron is unknown. On 24 March 2009, for the first time, two squadrons—INAS 311 and INAS 350—were commissioned on the same day. INAS 311 is intended for maritime patrol and operates Dornier 228s, whereas INAS 350, a multirole helicopter squadron, operates Sikorsky SH-3s. In 2011–2012, another two UAV squadrons—INAS 343 and INAS 344—were commissioned. In 2013, a fighter plane and a multirole helicopter squadron—INAS 303 and INAS 322—were commissioned with MiG-29Ks and HAL Dhruvs.

List of Squadrons

See also
 Indian Naval Air Arm
 List of Indian naval aircraft

Notes
Footnotes

Citations

References

External links

 Indian Navy official website
 Indian naval aviation official website

Aircraft squadrons of the Indian Navy